The Ahmed Zabana National Museum (El-mathaf El-ouatani Ahmed Zabana) is a museum located in Oran, Algeria, and named after the Algerian national hero Ahmed Zabana who was executed by the French on May 19, 1956, in Algiers.

Collections 
The first floor of the museum tells the story of the local impact of Algeria's battle for independence from France including a list of local people executed by the French between 1954 and 1962. The museum also includes artwork in the form of ancient sculptures, some mosaics and terracotta portraits and paintings including works by 20th-century Algerian artists and French Orientalists including Eugene Fromentin.

See also
 Algerian War
 List of cultural assets of Algeria

References 

History museums in Algeria
Buildings and structures in Oran
Art museums and galleries in Algeria
Tourist attractions in Oran